The Rocket 22 is a Canadian trailerable sailboat, that was designed by American Gary Mull and Canadian Don Martin as a racer and first built in 2002.

The Rocket 22 is a development of Mull's 1983 Laminex Pocket Rocket design.

Production
The boat was built by Rocket Boats in Canada, with 15 boats completed. The design is now out of production.

Design
The Rocket 22 is a small recreational keelboat, built predominantly of fibreglass, with wood trim. It has a fractional sloop rig, an transom-hung rudder and a retractable bulb fin keel. It displaces  and carries  of ballast.

It also features a retractable bowsprit for the large asymmetrical spinnaker.

The boat has a PHRF racing average handicap of 108 with a high of 138 and low of 93.

See also
List of sailing boat types

Related development
Laminex Pocket Rocket

References

Keelboats
2000s sailboat type designs
Sailing yachts
Trailer sailers
Sailboat type designs by Gary Mull
Sailboat type designs by Don Martin
Sailboat types built by Rocket Boats